HNLMS Koning der Nederlanden was an iron-hulled ironclad ramtorenschip (turret ram ship) built by the Rijkswerf at Amsterdam for the Royal Netherlands Navy in the early 1870s. She was the largest ship to serve in the Dutch Navy during the 19th century. The ship was converted to a barracks ship in the late 1890s and stationed in Surabaya in the Dutch East Indies. Koning der Nederlanden was scuttled in Surabaya on 2 March 1942, during the Battle of Java, to prevent her capture by the Japanese.

Design and description
HNLMS Koning der Nederlanden was the largest ship built for the Dutch Navy during the 19th century. She was fitted with a ram that protruded  from the bow. The turrets were rotated by hydraulic machinery.

She displaced . Her crew consisted of 256 officers and men.

Propulsion
Koning der Nederlanden had two compound steam engines, built by Penn and Sons, each driving a single  propeller. The engines were powered by seven boilers. She carried  of coal and had three funnels.

Armament
The ship mounted a pair of Armstrong  rifled muzzle-loading guns in each gun turret. Four  Krupp breech-loading guns were mounted on the upper deck and six  Hotchkiss 5-barrel revolving guns were also fitted in the ship's superstructure. They had a rate of fire of about 30 rounds per minute The ship was initially armed with spar torpedoes, but they were removed shortly after completion.

Armor
The deck was unarmored.

Service

Koning der Nederlanden was laid down at the Rijkswerf in Amsterdam on 31 December 1871. She was launched on 20 October 1874 and commissioned on 16 February 1877. The ship was designed by B.J. Tideman and renamed from Matador to Koning der Nederlanden during construction. In the autumn of 1876 the ship was transferred through the newly built North Sea Canal to the naval yard Willemsoord in Den Helder. In September 1877 she carried out see trials on the North and Baltic Sea. She left the Netherlands on 3 March 1878 for the Dutch East Indies where she arrived in Aceh on 6 may that year.

From there she steamed to Batavia where she arrived in June 1878 and was repaired at Surabaya from August until November that year. At the end of the year she was stationed at Batavia and served in the Auxiliary squadron. In May and June 1880 she made a trip to the Timor Archipelago to show the Dutch flag. From March till August 1881 Koning der Nederlanden was stationed at Cirebon. She was there to support measures taken by the civil government to counter the in- and export of cattle in the region. In late January 1882 she was again sent to Cirebon due to the outbreak of cholera. The ship was recalled after a few weeks and send to Riau for practice. In April and July 1883 she practiced respectively along the north coast of Java and the Sunda Strait. On 1 August she replaced Zeeland as  guard ship at Batavia. After an outbreak of cholera on board later that year the crew disinfected the ship in late September. Koning der Nederlanden was since December 1883 in Surabaya for repairs to her boilers. The boilers were later replaced in 1885 at Surabaya.
From 25 June 1889 until 1 January 1893 she was attached to the naval force stationed on the north coast of Aceh.
After that she served as station ship in Olehleh, Aceh until 7 February 1895.

The 37-millimeter guns were replaced by two quick-firing,  guns and four 37-millimeter quick-firers by 1890. The ship decommissioned on 1 April 1895 and began her conversion to an accommodation and guard ship at Surabaya Dockyard in August 1896. She retained all four of her 120-millimeter and two of her 37-millimeter guns when she recommissioned on 1 December 1899.

From 1920 till 1922 she served as debarkment and accommodation ship for the Submarine Service. She was set on fire in Surabaya and then scuttled to prevent her capture by the Japanese during World War II on 2 March 1942.

Notes

Footnotes

Citations

References

 
 
 Ross, David. Great Warships From The Age Of Steam. New York: Metro Books, 2014. 

Staatsbegrooting voor het dienstjaar 1878 (VI. 2.)
Staatsbegrooting voor het dienstjaar 1879 (VI. 2.)
Colonial reports:
Koloniaal verslag van 1879 (Bijlage C 5.2, Bijlage C 5.9)
Koloniaal verslag van 1881 (Bijlage C 5.8)
Koloniaal verslag van 1882 (Bijlage C 5.9)
Koloniaal verslag van 1884 (Bijlage C 5.8)
Koloniaal verslag van 1885 (Bijlage C 5.8)
Koloniaal verslag van 1888 (Bijlage C 5.9)
Koloniaal verslag van 1891 (Bijlage C 5.8)
Koloniaal verslag van 1892 (Bijlage C 5.10)
Koloniaal verslag van 1893 (Bijlage C 5.9)
Koloniaal verslag van 1894 (Bijlage C 5.9)
Koloniaal verslag van 1895 (Bijlage C 5.10)
Koloniaal verslag van 1921 (Bijlage D)
Koloniaal verslag van 1922 (Bijlage D)
Koloniaal verslag van 1923 (Bijlage E)

External links
Pictures of the ship on maritiemdigitaal.nl
Koning der Nederlanden on dutchsubmarines.com

19th-century naval ships of the Netherlands
1874 ships
Ships built in Amsterdam
Maritime incidents in March 1942
Scuttled vessels
World War II shipwrecks in the Java Sea